Karla Yunesca Torres Gómez (born 4 June 1992) is a Venezuelan footballer who plays as a midfielder for Portuguese club Paio Pires FC and the Venezuela women's national team.

Club career
Torres has played for Brazilian club EC Iranduba da Amazônia.

International career
Torres played for Venezuela at senior level in two Central American and Caribbean Games editions (2010 and 2018) and two Copa América Femenina editions (2010 and 2014).

References

1992 births
Living people
Women's association football midfielders
Venezuelan women's footballers
Footballers from Caracas
Venezuela women's international footballers
Caracas F.C. (women) players
Atlético Huila (women) players
Colo-Colo (women) footballers
Atlético Junior footballers
Venezuelan expatriate women's footballers
Venezuelan expatriate sportspeople in Colombia
Expatriate women's footballers in Colombia
Venezuelan expatriate sportspeople in Chile
Expatriate women's footballers in Chile
Venezuelan expatriate sportspeople in Brazil
Expatriate women's footballers in Brazil
Venezuelan expatriate sportspeople in Portugal
Expatriate women's footballers in Portugal